The Desert Song is a 1929 American Pre-Code operetta film directed by Roy Del Ruth and starring John Boles, Carlotta King, Louise Fazenda, and Myrna Loy. It was photographed partly in two-color Technicolor, the first film released by Warner Bros. to include footage in color. The film included a 10-minute intermission during which music was played.

It was based on the hit musical play with music by Sigmund Romberg and book and lyrics by Oscar Hammerstein, Otto Harbach, and Frank Mandel, which opened at the Casino Theatre on Broadway on November 30, 1926, and ran for a very successful 465 performances. Although some of the songs from the show have been omitted, the film is otherwise virtually a duplicate of the stage production and extremely faithful to it.

On the basis of the success of The Desert Song, Warner Bros. quickly cast John Boles in an all-color musical feature called Song of the West, which was completed by June 1929 but had its release delayed until March 1930.

Plot
French General Birabeau has been sent to Morocco to root out and destroy the Riffs, a band of Arab rebels, who threaten the safety of the French outpost in the Moroccan desert.  Their dashing, daredevil leader is the mysterious "Red Shadow".  Margot Bonvalet, a lovely, sassy French girl, is soon to be married at the fort to Birabeau's right-hand man, Captain Fontaine.  Birabeau's son Pierre, in reality the Red Shadow, loves Margot, but pretends to be a milksop to preserve his secret identity.  Margot tells Pierre that she secretly yearns to be swept into the arms of some bold, dashing sheik, perhaps even the Red Shadow himself.  Pierre, as the Red Shadow, kidnaps Margot and declares his love for her.

To her surprise, Margot's mysterious abductor treats her with every Western consideration.  When the Red Shadow comes face to face with General Birabeau, the old man challenges the rebel leader to a duel.  Of course Pierre will not kill his own father, so he refuses to fight, losing the respect of the Riffs.  Azuri, the sinuous and secretive native dancing girl, might be persuaded to answer some of these riddles if only she can be persuaded by Captain Fontaine. 
Meanwhile, two other characters, Benny (a reporter) and Susan provide comic relief.  Eventually, the Red Shadow's identity is discovered, a deal is struck with the Riffs, and Pierre and Margot live happily ever after.

Pre-Code Sequences
After 1935, the original 1929 version became impossible to exhibit in the United States due to its pre-Production Code era content, which included sexual innuendo, lewd suggestive humor, and open discussion of themes such as homosexuality (e.g. Johnny Arthur plays a character who is obviously gay). Consequently, a cleaned-up remake was released in 1943, with a third version following in 1953.

Cast

John Boles as The Red Shadow
Carlotta King as Margot
Louise Fazenda as Susan
Myrna Loy as Azuri
Johnny Arthur as Benny Kidd
Edward Martindel as General Bierbeau
John Miljan as Captain Fontaine
Marie Wells as Clementina
Jack Pratt as Pasha
Otto Hoffman as Hasse
Roberto E. Guzmán as Sid El Kar
Del Elliott as Rebel
Source:

Reception
According to Warner Bros records the film earned $1,549,000 domestically and $1,473,000 foreign.
Film critic Violet LeVoit observes on TCM.com: “If Warner Brothers had not sat on the completed reels of this two-strip Technicolor musical for five inexplicable months, it would have beat MGM's Broadway Melody (1929) into theaters and enjoyed the distinction of being the first all-talkie (all-singie?) musical. But while the considerably stiff and stodgy Broadway Melody won Best Picture in 1929, modern audiences find more to love in this Moroccan desert operetta... not only because of the Oscar Hammerstein lyrics but the snappy direction of Roy Del Ruth, the shadowy, sensuous cinematography by Barney McGill, and how stars John Boles and Carlotta King can (belt) out the bold music with more power than other wispy singers in the early days of amplified sound.“

Songs

"Riff Song"
"French Marching Song"
"Then You Will Know"
"The Desert Song"
"Azuri's Dance"
"Love's Dear Yearning"

"Let Love Go"
"One Flower"
"One Alone"
"Sabre Song"
"The Desert Song Ballet"

Preservation status
A complete 35mm nitrate print of the film is held by the BFI archive.  A 16mm black and white print also exists from which all circulating collector prints have been made. The film elements from this 16mm source are missing a small portion of one of the musical numbers but the complete soundtrack survives intact on Vitaphone disks.

See also
List of early color feature films

References

External links

 
 The Desert Song (1929) on Turner Classic Movies
 
 
 Still of Myrna Loy at gettyimages.com
 Still of John Boles and Carlotta King at fineartamerica.com

1929 films
1929 musical films
1920s color films
1920s LGBT-related films
American musical films
1920s English-language films
American films based on plays
Films directed by Roy Del Ruth
Films set in Morocco
French Foreign Legion in popular culture
Warner Bros. films
Films set in deserts
American black-and-white films
Films based on operettas
Operetta films
Films partially in color
1920s American films